British Columbia Highway 37A, which is known as the Stewart Highway and also as the Glacier Highway, is a 65 km (40 mi) long spur of Highway 37 west from Meziadin Junction to the border towns of Stewart and Hyder, Alaska, where it connects with Alaska's Salmon River Road. It was first built in the early 1960s to facilitate the movement of asbestos from the town of Cassiar. The Highway 37A designation was assigned in 1984.

The Salmon River Road continues from the border as an unsigned highway in Alaska, and heads north-westerly through Hyder and the Tongass National Forest.  It crosses the border again at the abandoned town site of Premier, British Columbia, where it continues on as Granduc Road to the Salmon Glacier summit viewpoint ending at the Granduc Mine.

The road is extremely vulnerable to avalanches through Bear Pass. As such, the Ministry of Transportation and Infrastructure runs an anti-avalanche program through the pass.

References

External links

 weather.com description of route

Stewart Country
Nass Country
037